Samadrexha (Albanian: Samadrexhë; Serbian Cyrillic: Самодрежа, Samodreža), is a village in the Vushtrria municipality in Kosovo. It is inhabited exclusively by ethnic Albanians.

The local Serbian Orthodox church, Church of St. John the Baptist, is a monument that dates back to the middle ages. According to Serbian myth, the church is the site where Prince Lazar of Serbia and his knights received communion before the Battle of Kosovo (1389).

Notes

References

External links

Villages in Vushtrri
Medieval sites in Serbia